Anthony Francis Cline (July 25, 1948 – July 23, 2018) was an American football defensive end who played professional football in the National Football League (NFL) for the Oakland Raiders from 1970 to 1975 and the San Francisco 49ers from 1976 to 1977. He played college football at the University of Miami.   Some researchers claim that he holds the American Football Conference (AFC) rookie sack record with 17½ in 1970, but the NFL has only recognized a sack as an official statistic since 1982, so Cline's record is not officially recognized.  His son, Tony Cline Jr., also played in the NFL. His son-in-law, Jason Kapono played 8 seasons in the NBA.

References

1948 births
2018 deaths
American football defensive ends
Miami Hurricanes football players
Oakland Raiders players
San Francisco 49ers players
People from Michigan City, Indiana
Players of American football from Indiana
Sportspeople from the Chicago metropolitan area